Francisco Tejedor (born June 20, 1966) is a retired Colombian boxer. He competed in the men's light flyweight event at the 1984 Summer Olympics.

Professional career

He turned professional in 1986 and won 28 consecutive fights before unsuccessfully challenging Humberto González for the WBC light flyweight title. Tejedor would work his way back to another title shot and on February 18, 1995 he beat José Luis Zepeda for the vacant IBF world title by way of 7th-round TKO. He would go on to lose the belt in his first title defense to Danny Romero in April of the same year. He lost his final 10 fights and retired from the sport in 2004.

See also
List of flyweight boxing champions

References

External links

1966 births
Living people
Colombian male boxers
Light-flyweight boxers
Flyweight boxers
Bantamweight boxers
Super-bantamweight boxers
World flyweight boxing champions
International Boxing Federation champions
Sportspeople from Barranquilla
Olympic boxers of Colombia
Boxers at the 1984 Summer Olympics
20th-century Colombian people